Conyers School is a coeducational secondary school and sixth form with academy status, in Yarm, Stockton-on-Tees, England.

History
The Free Grammar School was founded in 1590 by Thomas Conyers of Egglescliffe, who was issued letters patent by Queen Elizabeth I to found a grammar school in the parish of Yarm. The original Free Grammar School of Thomas Conyers was in the grounds of Yarm Parish Church, but transferred to a site off The Spital in 1884. In 1977, the school moved to its present site on Green Lane when it became a comprehensive school. The fee-paying Yarm School was founded on the site at The Spital in the following year.

Present day
The school catchment area covers the parish of Yarm and the surrounding villages including Kirklevington, as well as a proportion of Ingleby Barwick. Conyers has approximately 1500 pupils, including 1300 in the lower school and 200 in the sixth form, with pupils studying for GCSE and GCE A-level examinations. Students are also able to study certain NVQ and BTEC courses. The current headteacher is Louise Spellman. Conyers School is one of a number of sixth form providers in the local area.

The school's previous Executive Head, John Morgan, was the President of the Association of School and College Leaders (ASCL) for the 2009-10 academic year. Whilst on this one year secondment, Louise Spellman became the school's Acting Head Teacher. In September 2010 the school remodelled its leadership. John Morgan returned from secondment to become Executive Headteacher. Louise Spellman took the role of Head of School.

On 21 June 2012 the school announced that John Morgan, Head Teacher since 1995, had died. The school set up a condolence page on its web site.

In April 2012, the school began a consultation on the possibility of an academy conversion. The consultation found that there was an overall majority for supporting academy status. The school converted into an academy on 1 February 2013.

Academic performance and inspections

The October 2010 Ofsted inspection awarded the school a Grade 1 "Outstanding" for overall effectiveness.

As of 2023, the school's most recent inspection was a short inspection in 2018, with a judgement of Good.

In 2022 at A level and in NVQs and BTECs students achieved a 39% pass rate in all courses. 2.8% of all grades were at A*/A and 7% were A*-B.

The school received national recognition in 2021 for its provision of remote learning during the Covid-19 Pandemic.

Ofsted has criticised in the past the open access nature to the site, identifying it as dangerous.

References

External links
School website
BBC league table

Conyers School
Secondary schools in the Borough of Stockton-on-Tees
1590 establishments in England
Academies in the Borough of Stockton-on-Tees
Yarm